Helen Brown Shaw, MBE (née Graham; 2 June 1879 – 20 April 1964) was a Unionist Party politician in Scotland.

Career 
Shaw was active during World War I, chairing charities such as the Lanarkshire Prisoners of War Relief Committee. She was made an MBE in 1920. In 1930, she was the first woman to be elected to Lanarkshire County Council.

In the Conservative landslide of 1931, Shaw was elected Member of Parliament for the normally Labour seat of Bothwell. She held the seat until 1935, when it was regained by Labour. As an MP, she worked for improved condition in the Lanarkshire mines, and to bring new industries to the area. In 1938, she became district administrator of the WVS for air raid precautions, West of Scotland.

Personal life 
Shaw was the daughter of Annie Gillespie and David Graham, born in Glasgow, Scotland, on 2 June 1879. She married Major David Shaw of the 6th Cameronians on 18 September 1879. He was killed in action in Festubert, France in World War I. They had a daughter and a son. Her daughter, Anne Gillespie Shaw CBE, was a time and motion expert, and production engineer. Her son, Gavin Shaw, was president of the Bothwell Unionist Association, and was killed in action in World War II.

References

External links 
 

1879 births
1964 deaths
Members of the Parliament of the United Kingdom for Scottish constituencies
Unionist Party (Scotland) MPs
UK MPs 1931–1935
Members of the Order of the British Empire
Female members of the Parliament of the United Kingdom for Scottish constituencies
20th-century Scottish women politicians
20th-century Scottish politicians